Heaton is a civil parish in the district of Staffordshire Moorlands, Staffordshire, England. It contains 16 listed buildings that are recorded in the National Heritage List for England.  All the listed buildings are designated at Grade II, the lowest of the three grades, which is applied to "buildings of national importance and special interest".  Apart from the village of Heaton, the parish is entirely rural.  The parish contains a country house, which is listed together with associated structures, and all the other listed buildings are farmhouses and farm buildings.


Buildings

References

Citations

Sources

Lists of listed buildings in Staffordshire